Westmark is an unincorporated community in Phelps County, Nebraska, United States.

History
A post office was established at Westmark in 1879, and remained in operation until it was discontinued in 1903. Westmark was likely named for a pioneer settler.

References

Unincorporated communities in Phelps County, Nebraska
Unincorporated communities in Nebraska